Michael Dow  is an Australian Paralympic swimmer and weightlifter who won two gold, two silver and a  bronze medal at the 1964 Summer Paralympics. He was one of only two Victorian athletes selected to compete at these games.

Biography

Dow contracted poliomyelitis at 4 years of age while living with his family in Borneo. The family moved to Venezuela in 1954 and returned to Melbourne Victoria in 1959. His interest in sport developed through newspapers, that included articles about sporting opportunities for the disabled and achievements of people with spinal cord injuries. In addition, the Victorian Paraplegic Sports Club supported  local, national and international competitions for people with a disability which included the Victorian Championships held annually at Albert Park, The Australian Championships held bi-annually, and  the Inaugural Commonwealth Games held in Perth Western Australia, in November 1962. This event is held every four years.
 
Selection for the 1964 Summer Paralympics was based on Dow's outstanding results achieved at the National Championships. He competed in sprint, long distance track, javelin, and weightlifting that was an Australian innovation, the program being developed in Perth.

At the 1964 Summer Paralympics, he won two gold medals in the Men's 50 m Breaststroke incomplete class 3 and Men's 50 m Freestyle Supine incomplete class 3 events, a silver medal in Men's Weightlifting Featherweight event, a bronze medal in the Men's 50 m Freestyle Prone incomplete class 3 event., and a silver medal in the 4 x 60 metre wheelchair relay.

Following his outstanding results at the 1964 Paralympics, Dow then decided to retire and concentrate on his studies. In 1970, he completed his Bachelor of Arts Degree at Monash University Melbourne.

Dow dropped out of competition for ten years, returned in 1979 and again in 1981 to compete in the Australian Paraplegic Championships. He then retired from competitive sport.

References

Male Paralympic swimmers of Australia
Paralympic weightlifters of Australia
Swimmers at the 1964 Summer Paralympics
Weightlifters at the 1964 Summer Paralympics
Medalists at the 1964 Summer Paralympics
Paralympic gold medalists for Australia
Paralympic silver medalists for Australia
Paralympic bronze medalists for Australia
Wheelchair category Paralympic competitors
People with polio
Living people
Year of birth missing (living people)
Paralympic medalists in athletics (track and field)
Paralympic medalists in weightlifting
Paralympic medalists in swimming
Australian male freestyle swimmers